Schwelm station is the most important station in the city of Schwelm in the German state of North Rhine-Westphalia. All regional and S-Bahn trains stop at the station. Long-distance services pass through without stopping.

History 

The first station building was opened by the Bergisch-Märkische Railway Company on 9 October 1847 along with its Elberfeld–Dortmund line. Since its inauguration, the station has been rebuilt several times, starting in 1865. In 1902, the platforms received a canopy and, on 8 November 1902, an underpass was completed to the second platform. In 1926, Schwelm became a railway junction, when the Witten–Wengern Ost/Schwelm railway was opened by Deutsche Reichsbahn.

In 1988, the station became part of the Rhine-Ruhr S-Bahn, on line S 8 from Hagen via Wuppertal to Mönchengladbach. This uses a flying junction built by the Deutsche Bundesbahn in the 1980s that takes the S-Bahn tracks from Wuppertal to Schwelm under the parallel mainline tracks running towards Hagen directly east of Schwelm station, connecting via a short section of the Witten–Wengern Ost/Schwelm line (the rest of which is closed) to the partially closed Düsseldorf-Derendorf–Dortmund Süd railway towards Gevelsberg-West.

Platforms  

The station has four platform tracks, which are accessed from two island platforms. Services on S-Bahn line S 8 stop on tracks 1 and 2. The Regional-Express services on lines RE 4 (Wupper-Express), RE 7 (Rhein-Münsterland-Express) and RE 13 (Maas-Wupper-Express) use tracks 3 and 4, which are also used by the non-stopping long-distance trains. Only the S-Bahn tracks can be reached by lift. In the entrance hall of the station building, there is a Deutsche Bahn ticket office and ticket vending machines.

The station is served by Regional-Express services RE 4, RE 7 and RE 13, Rhine-Ruhr S-Bahn line S 8 between Mönchengladbach and Hagen and line S 9 between Recklinghausen and Hagen, all every 60 minutes.

Notes

External links

Railway stations in North Rhine-Westphalia
Rhine-Ruhr S-Bahn stations
S8 (Rhine-Ruhr S-Bahn)
S9 (Rhine-Ruhr S-Bahn)
Railway stations in Germany opened in 1847
1847 establishments in Prussia
Ennepe-Ruhr-Kreis